Nalorphine (brand names Lethidrone, Nalline), also known as N-allylnormorphine, is a mixed opioid agonist–antagonist with opioid antagonist and analgesic properties. It was introduced in 1954 and was used as an antidote to reverse opioid overdose and in a challenge test to determine opioid dependence.

Nalorphine was the second opioid antagonist to be introduced, preceded by nalodeine (N-allylnorcodeine) in 1915 and followed by naloxone in 1960 and naltrexone in 1963. Due to potent activation of the κ-opioid receptor, nalorphine produces side effects such as dysphoria, anxiety, confusion, and hallucinations, and for this reason, is no longer used medically.

Pharmacology

Pharmacodynamics
Nalorphine acts at two opioid receptors — the μ-opioid receptor (MOR) where it has antagonistic effects, and at the κ-opioid receptor (KOR) (Ki = 1.6 nM; EC50 = 483 nM; Emax = 95%) where it exerts high-efficacy partial agonist/near-full agonist characteristics.

Chemistry

Analogues
Nalorphine has a number of analogues including niconalorphine (the nicomorphine analogue), diacetylnalorphine (heroin analogue), dihydronalorphine (dihydromorphine), and a number of others as well as a number of codeine-based analogues.

Synthesis

More recently, it has become much more commonplace to use ethyl chloroformate instead of cyanogen bromide for the Von Braun degradation demethylation step. See for example the list of phenyltropanes or the synthesis of paroxetine for further examples of this.

See also
 Diacetylnalorphine
 Levallorphan
 Nalbuphine
 Nalorphine dinicotinate

References

Abandoned drugs
Allyl compounds
Antidotes
Cyclohexenes
Dissociative drugs
4,5-Epoxymorphinans
Kappa-opioid receptor agonists
Mu-opioid receptor antagonists
Phenols
Secondary alcohols
Semisynthetic opioids